Guo Chunquan (Chinese: 郭纯泉; born 2 January 1985) is a Chinese football goalkeeper who currently plays for Zhejiang Yiteng in the China League Two.

Club career
In 2004, Guo Chunquan would start his professional footballer career with Shenyang Ginde in the Chinese Super League. He would make his debut for Shenyang in a league game on 3 April 2005 against Beijing Guoan that ended in a 1-1 draw. This performance would see Guo become the club's first choice goalkeeper until on 2 July 2005 when he was at fault for conceding the first goal of a 6-1 defeat to Shanghai Shenhua in a league game. He would eventually be dropped to the bench and was transfer listed before the start of the 2008 league season where he remained until his contract expired.

In February 2011, Guo transferred to China League One side Tianjin Songjiang on a free transfer. In July 2012, he was to China League Two side Shaanxi Daqin until 31 December.
In March 2013, Guo transferred to China League One side Harbin Yiteng.
On 21 January 2015, Guo transferred to Chinese Super League side Henan Jianye.
In March 2016, Guo transferred to China League Two side Baotou Nanjiao.
On 18 January 2017, Guo returned to Yiteng FC.

On 28 February 2018, Guo transferred to Liaoning F.C.

Career statistics 
Statistics accurate as of match played 31 December 2020.

References

External links
 

1985 births
Living people
Chinese footballers
Footballers from Shenyang
Changsha Ginde players
Tianjin Tianhai F.C. players
Zhejiang Yiteng F.C. players
Henan Songshan Longmen F.C. players
Liaoning F.C. players
Chinese Super League players
China League One players
Association football goalkeepers